Sori may refer to:

Things
 The plural of sorus, a cluster of sporangia 
 SoRI-20041, a drug
 SoRI-9409, a drug

Places
 Sori, Benin, a town in Benin, West Africa
 Sori, Kenya, a town in Kenya, East Africa
 Sori, Liguria, an Italian comune (municipality)
 Sori Square, a city square in Tampere, Pirkanmaa, Finland
 Sōri Station, a train station in Midori, Gunma Prefecture, Japan
 Sori, Bihar, a village in Aurangabad District, Bihar

People
Surname:
 Ibrahim Sori (died c. 1784), leader of the Kingdom of Fouta Djallon in what is now Guinea in West Africa
 Abdul Rahman Ibrahima Sori (1762–1829), West African prince, enslaved in the United States
 Fumihiko Sori (born 1964), Japanese film director and producer
 Soni Sori (born c. 1975), Indian schoolteacher and human rights activist
 Rosine Sori-Coulibaly (born 1958), Burkinabé economist and politician

Given name 
 Sori Yanagi (1915–2011), Japanese product designer
 Sori Siregar (born 1939), Indonesian writer
 Ok So-ri (born 1968), South Korean actress
 Moon So-ri (born 1974), South Korean actress
 Sori (singer) (born Kim So-ri, 1990), South Korean singer
 Sori Choi, South Korean percussionist

Music
 Sori (music), a symbol used in Iranian traditional music that denotes a quarter step upwards in tone

See also

Soori (disambiguation)
Souri, town in Alibori Department, Benin
Soris, Egyptian pharaoh, founding monarch of the 4th Dynasty